Earl of Middlesex was a title that was created twice in the Peerage of England. The first creation came in 1622 for Lionel Cranfield, 1st Baron Cranfield, the Lord High Treasurer. He had already been created Baron Cranfield, of Cranfield in the County of Bedford, the year before, also in the Peerage of England. He was succeeded by his elder son, the second Earl. On his early death in 1651 the titles passed to his younger brother, the third Earl. The titles became extinct when the latter died childless in 1674.

Lady Frances Cranfield, daughter of the first Earl and sister of the second and third Earls, married Richard Sackville, 5th Earl of Dorset. The barony and earldom were revived in 1675 in favour of their son Charles, who two years later also succeeded his father in the earldom of Dorset. See Duke of Dorset for further history of this creation.

Earls of Middlesex; First creation (1622)
Lionel Cranfield, 1st Earl of Middlesex (1574–1645)
James Cranfield, 2nd Earl of Middlesex (1621–1651)
Lionel Cranfield, 3rd Earl of Middlesex (1625–1674)

Earls of Middlesex; Second creation (1675)
Charles Sackville, 1st Earl of Middlesex (1638–1706) (succeeded as 6th Earl of Dorset in 1677)
Lionel Cranfield Sackville, 2nd Earl of Middlesex (1688–1765) (created Duke of Dorset in 1720)
see Duke of Dorset for further history of the titles

References

Extinct earldoms in the Peerage of England
1622 establishments in England
Noble titles created in 1622
Noble titles created in 1675